Dianna Lynn Gwilliams DL (born 1957) is the current dean of Guildford.

Background 
Gwilliams was born in Colorado and grew up in California.

She was educated at the University of California (BA Physics & Chemistry, 1978) and King's College London (MA, 2001) in Youth Ministry and Theological Education. In 1978, she travelled to the UK while she was on tour (as a sound engineer) for a musical called The Witness. She was a sound engineer for 12 years.

Clergy 
Gwilliams was ordained deacon in 1992 and priest in 1994. After serving curacies at the St Saviour, Peckham (known locally as the Copleston Church and Centre) and St Barnabas, Dulwich she became Vicar of Saint Barnabas, Dulwich and Foundation Chaplain of Alleyn's College in 1999.

She was appointed Dean of Guildford in 2013 and instituted at Guildford Cathedral on 15 September 2013. She was the first female Dean of Guildford and is one of the most senior female priests in the Church of England (alongside five other female Deans).

Personal life 
She has three children (including a daughter who died in infancy), five grandchildren and her husband is a stonemason. She is a Deputy Lieutenant of Surrey.

References

Living people
1957 births
People from Colorado
University of California alumni
American audio engineers
Alumni of King's College London
Deans of Guildford
Deputy Lieutenants of Surrey
Women audio engineers